Cody Allen Christian (born April 15, 1995) is an American actor. He is known for his recurring role as Mike Montgomery in the ABC Family/Freeform series Pretty Little Liars, and for his role as Theo Raeken from the fifth and sixth seasons of the MTV series Teen Wolf. His accolades include nominations for a  Teen Choice Award.

Christian currently stars as Asher Adams, a high school football player, in the CW Network's All American. He has also done voice acting, as the voice of Cloud Strife in the video game Final Fantasy VII Remake, for which he received a BAFTA Award for Performer in a Leading Role nomination.

Career 
From 2010 to 2015, Christian played Mike Montgomery, the younger brother of Aria Montgomery, on the Freeform television series Pretty Little Liars.

Other acting credits include appearances on television series True Blood, Grey's Anatomy and Back to You with Laura Marano, and in the 2011 film Kill the Irishman. Christian starred in the 2013 film The Starving Games, a parody of The Hunger Games films.

He appears in seasons 5 and 6 of the MTV series Teen Wolf, playing a recurring character named Theo Raeken, a former human who was turned into a hybrid creature called a Chimera – in his case, possessing both werewolf and werecoyote powers. In 2018, Christian began a role as Asher Adams in The CW television show All American.

As a voice actor, Christian has voiced the iconic video game character Cloud Strife in Final Fantasy VII Remake.

In 2019, he began to release rap songs through his personal YouTube channel; so far, he has released five songs.

On June 26, 2020, Christian was one of the Teen Wolf alums who participated in a special live YouTube chat to promote isolation and social distancing amid the COVID-19 pandemic.

Personal life 
Christian is the son of a Native American mother, who is of the Penobscot Nation and grew up on a reservation in Maine.

Christian's mother is a breast cancer survivor and he has campaigned to raise money for breast cancer research.

Filmography

Film

Television

Video games

Music
Christian has released several rap songs on his YouTube channel, including "Hills", "Drippin", "Almost", "Blessed", and "Vacation".

Awards and nominations

References

External links

 
 

1995 births
Living people
American male child actors
American male film actors
American male television actors
American male video game actors
American male voice actors
Male actors from Portland, Maine
American people of Native American descent
Native American male actors
Penobscot people
21st-century American male actors